Bramshott Common is part of a large expanse of heathland, including Ludshott Common, near Bramshott, Hampshire, England.

It was the site of Bramshott Camps, set up to accommodate Canadian troops during the two world wars. It is bisected by the A3 trunk road.

References

External links

Geography of Hampshire